Representative Saiki may refer to:

Pat Saiki (born 1930), former US Representative
Scott Saiki (born 1964), Hawaii state representative